North Leverton with Habblesthorpe is a village and civil parish in the English county of Nottinghamshire.  The population (including Coates) as at the 2011 Census was 1,047.

Unlike other civil parishes with a name of the form "X with Y", North Leverton with Habblesthorpe is shown as such on Ordnance Survey maps and thus has the longest name of a village in England and is the second longest in Europe, behind a Welsh village. 

The village has a primary school, a parish church, a small village store/post office, and a pub-The Royal Oak.

North Leverton Windmill 
The village has a working windmill which was built in 1813 and is a grade II* listed building. The windmill is open every Saturday, sells wholemeal, spelt, white flour, oats and souvenirs. There is no admission fee to enter the mill, tours are free and there is a donation box with all donations go towards the upkeep of the mill.

St Martin's Church 
The parish church of St Martin is medieval, the oldest part being the south doorway of ca. 1200. The church was built in the Norman period, circa 1200. The ornate window tracery of the south aisle and the chancel, dating from ca. 1300–40, is the chief feature of interest. The west tower is Perpendicular.
The church was restored in 1878.

Habblesthorpe Manor 
Habblesthorpe Manor is a small early 17th century brick built house. This is listed as a grade II listed building on the British listed Buildings website.

References

External links

Villages in Nottinghamshire
Bassetlaw District